The city and county of Denver is the capital and most populous city in the state of Colorado. It is located in the South Platte River Valley on the western edge of the High Plains just east of the Rocky Mountains. It is part of the wider Denver metropolitan area which has other populated cities including Aurora, Boulder Lakewood, Westminster, and Castle Rock. 

Denver is also home to many professional sports teams who are based out of Denver and surrounding cities in the metro area. It is also one of the twelve American cities to house a team from each of the U.S. cities with teams from four major league sports. All four of its teams play their home games near downtown with three active sports venues which includes Empower Field at Mile High, home of the Denver Broncos; the Ball Arena, home of the Colorado Avalanche and Denver Nuggets; and Coors Field, home of the Colorado Rockies. There is also a Major League Soccer (MLS) team based in the Denver metro area (Colorado Rapids), but they do not play their home games in the city of Denver and is located in nearby Commerce City.

Denver, and the wider metropolitan area, is home to four college sports teams with two schools having NCAA Division I programs and two schools with NCAA Division II programs. The Colorado Buffaloes are located in Boulder which is part of the metro area while the Denver Pioneers, Metro State Roadrunners and Regis Rangers are located in Denver.

Major league professional teams

Denver is the smallest of the 13 U.S. cities with teams from four major sports.

The Denver Broncos of the National Football League (NFL) have drawn crowds of over 70,000 since their AFL origins in the early 1960s at Mile High Stadium and continue to draw fans today to their current home Empower Field at Mile High. The Broncos have sold out every home game (except for strike-replacement games) since 1970. The Broncos last championship was in 2016, defeating the Carolina Panthers in Super Bowl 50. In total, the Broncos have advanced to the Super Bowl eight times and won back-to-back titles in 1998 and 1999, and again in 2015.

In the 1980s and 90s, one of the top priorities of former Mayor Federico Peña was bringing Major League Baseball to the city. In 1993, the MLB awarded an expansion team to Denver and they were named the Colorado Rockies. Mile High Stadium was home to the Rockies from 1993 to 1995 while Coors Field was under construction. They appeared in their first World Series in 2007 after winning their first NL pennant, their only one to this day, where they were swept by the Boston Red Sox of the American League in four games.

The Denver Nuggets of the National Basketball Association (NBA) play at the Ball Arena. The team was founded as the Denver Larks in 1967 as a charter franchise of the American Basketball Association (ABA) but changed its name to the Denver Rockets before their first season. They changed their name to the Denver Nuggets in 1974. The team joined the NBA in 1976 after the ABA-NBA merger. They have not made an appearance in an NBA Finals since joining the NBA.

Denver is also home to the Colorado Avalanche, a National Hockey League (NHL) team that relocated from Quebec City in 1995. They have won three Stanley Cups in 1996, 2001 and in 2022 while playing in Denver, and they also play at Ball Arena. The Avalanche played the Detroit Red Wings in the first ever outdoor professional hockey game in Denver on Saturday, February 27, 2016 at Coors Field and again against the Los Angeles Kings at the Air Force Academy on Saturday, February 15, 2020.

The Colorado Rapids of Major League Soccer (MLS) play at Dick's Sporting Goods Park, a soccer-specific stadium in the Denver suburb of Commerce City. The Rapids were one of the ten founding teams of Major League Soccer that began play in 1996, and initially played at what was then known as Invesco Field at Mile High before moving into their current home in 2007. The Rapids won the MLS Cup in 2010. The Rapids' main rival is Real Salt Lake, and the two teams play every year for the Rocky Mountain Cup. Dick's Sporting Goods Park has also hosted several international soccer matches, including U.S. national team qualifying matches for the 2010 and 2014 World Cups.

Top tier amateur teams
Denver and the wider metro area is also home to other professional sports teams.

College sports teams
 Colorado Buffaloes: The CU Buffaloes are a member of the Pac-12 Conference and are located in Boulder.
 Denver Pioneers: The DU Pioneers, located in the city of Denver, play in NCAA Division I and are a member of The Summit League. In sports not sponsored by that conference, it is a member of several other conferences; most notably, the men's ice hockey team plays in the National Collegiate Hockey Conference, the women's gymnastics team in the Big 12 Conference, and the men's and women's lacrosse teams in the Big East Conference.
 Metro State Roadrunners: The Metro State Roadrunners play in NCAA Division II and are a member of the Rocky Mountain Athletic Conference and are located in Denver.
 Regis Rangers: The Regis Rangers play in NCAA Division II and are a member of the Rocky Mountain Athletic Conference and are located in Denver.

Former teams

Denver Bears (Western League) former Western League team (1885-1954); replaced by the new Denver Bears
Denver Zephyrs originally, the Denver Bears, who played in the American Association (1955-1962, 1969-1992) and the Pacific Coast League (1963-1968) moved to New Orleans in 1992. Now play as the Wichita Wind Surge
Denver Nuggets former National Basketball League & National Basketball Association team (1948–1950); folded as the Evansville Agogans
Denver Spurs former World Hockey Association team (1975–76); folded as the Ottawa Civics
Colorado Rockies former National Hockey League team (1976–1982); now play as the New Jersey Devils
Denver Avalanche former Major Indoor Soccer League team (1980–1982); ceased operations
Colorado Flames former Central Professional Hockey League team (1982–1984); league ceased operations
Denver Gold former United States Football League team (1983–1985); ceased operations
Denver Dynamite former Arena Football League team (1987, 1989–1991); ceased operations
Denver Rangers former International Hockey League team (1988-1989); folded as the Phoenix Roadrunners 
Denver Grizzlies former International Hockey League team (1994–1995); relocated to Utah after one season. Now play in the American Hockey League as the Cleveland Monsters
Colorado Crush former Arena Football League team (2003–2008); the AFL suspended operations indefinitely
Denver Cutthroats former Central Hockey League team (2012–2014); league ceased operations
Denver Stampede former PRO Rugby team (2016–2017); league ceased operations after one season
Colorado Raptors former Major League Rugby team (2018-2020); withdrew from the league after three seasons of play
Denver Dynamite (soccer) former PASL-Pro (2008-2010) & PASL-Premier (2011-2015) team; ceased operations
Furniture Row Racing, former NASCAR team that fielded the #78 Chevrolet SS for Martin Truex Jr., was owned and sponsored by the U.S. furniture store chain Furniture Row as the only NASCAR team headquartered in Colorado until 2018.
Denver Outlaws, former Major League Lacrosse team (2006–2020), ceased operations after the MLL–PLL merger

Event hosting

Local events
 Denver hosted a yearly auto race on the Champ Car World Series circuit, the Grand Prix of Denver, before that series' demise in 2008.
 The Colorado Colfax Marathon is run through the city annually.

"Big Four" events
 The 1998 and 2021 Major League Baseball All-Star Game at Coors Field.
 The 2001 NHL All-Star Game and FanFest at Pepsi Center.
 The ABA All-Star Game in 1976, the 1984 NBA All-Star Game at McNichols Arena, and the 2005 NBA All-Star game at Pepsi Center.

International events
 Initially awarded the 1976 Winter Olympics. However, due to rising costs and worries about environmental impact, voters rejected a public-funding ballot measure. Without the bond, Denver could not support the games, and the IOC retracted the award.
 The city strongly considered a bid for the 2022 Winter Olympics. In December 2011 a Denver 2022 exploratory committee was launched. Reno-Tahoe was also interested in bidding for 2022.
 The Churchill Cup, a now-defunct annual international competition in rugby union featuring the USA and Canada senior national teams, the England Saxons (that country's second-level national team), and three invited teams, was hosted by Denver in 2009, with matches held at the rugby-specific Infinity Park in Glendale and Dick's Sporting Goods Park. Denver was suggested as a permanent home for the competition. The 2010 tournament featured preliminary rounds in Denver. Also, Denver was reportedly in the running to host a Bledisloe Cup match between the Australia and New Zealand national teams, possibly in 2010, though that did not materialize.

Other events
 Denver co-hosted the 1962 International Ice Hockey Federation World Championships (together with Colorado Springs).
 Denver also hosted the 1990 NCAA Final Four at McNichols Arena.
 The Ultimate Fighting Championship, which eventually become the world's leading mixed martial arts organization, held its first two events in Denver—UFC 1 on November 12, 1993 and UFC 2 on March 11, 1994.
 The 2008 NCAA Frozen Four Tournament was hosted in Denver.
Denver was the host for Sportaccord 2009, the largest international sports convention in the world.
 Infinity Park became the new host of the USA Women's Sevens, the country's stop in the World Rugby Women's Sevens Series for national rugby sevens teams, in 2018.

Detailed information by team

Current teams

College teams

Former teams

See also
Sports in Colorado

Notes

References